The Nokondi Cup is a league competition where eight teams in the Eastern Highlands region of Papua New Guinea play rugby league. The league was thought up by The Papua New Guinea Rugby Football League (PNGRFL) in late 2006/early 2007 after other regions of Papua New Guinea created local leagues. The season runs from March to November with the first being in 2007. There were also similar competitions for 'A' teams, and under 16 teams.

Teams

The teams were split into the eight districts of the province:

 Daulo
 Goroka
 Henganofi
 Kainantu
 Lufa
 Obura Wonenara
 Okapa
 Unggai Bena

See also

 Rugby league in Papua New Guinea
 Papua New Guinea national rugby league team

References

Oceanian rugby league competitions
Rugby league in Papua New Guinea